Gophers! was a Channel 4 children's programme about a family of American gophers who move into a new neighbourhood, called Sycamore Heights, living next door to a family of uptight but well-intentioned rabbits, The Burrows.

There were many recurring jokes within this short-lived show such as Arthur Burrows' vegetables planning a rebellion to escape his garden, a mad scientist ferret called Dr Wince, whose ambition was to conquer the world by obtaining a crystal buried in the Gophers' garden with the help of his reptilian servant Sly, and an alien in love with a zucchini determined to get home. Also there were Stereotypical "Mexican" cockroaches (Dressed in costumes of Mexican Peasant Revolutionaries of the Mexican Revolution of 1910)  who lived in the Gophers' house or Trailer Park Mobile Home always trying to steal their food.

External links
 
 Gophers! at ClassicKidsTV.co.uk

1988 British television series debuts
1990 British television series endings
1980s British children's television series
1990s British children's television series
Channel 4 original programming
British children's television series
Fictional gophers
Television series about mammals
British television shows featuring puppetry
English-language television shows